The 18th Cruiser Squadron  was a formation of cruisers of the Royal Navy from 1939 to 1942. The squadron was formed in September 1939 and was assigned to the Home Fleet until it was disbanded in October 1942. It included .

Commanders 

Included:

Footnotes

References 
  Jones, Ben (2016). The Fleet Air Arm in the Second World War. Oxford, England: Routledge. .
  Mackie, Gordon. (2018) "Royal Navy Senior Appointments from 1865" (PDF). gulabin.com. Gordon Mackie.
  Pearson, Robert (2015). Gold Run: The Rescue of Norway's Gold Bullion from the Nazis, 1940. Casemate. .
  Watson, Dr Graham. (2015) "Royal Navy Organization in World War 2, 1939-1945: Overseas Commands and Fleets". www.naval-history.net. Gordon Smith.

Cruiser squadrons of the Royal Navy
Military units and formations of the Royal Navy in World War II
Military units and formations established in 1939